Annie Marion MacLean (1869–1934) was a pioneering American sociologist of the women's Chicago School, and is sometimes referred to as the "mother of contemporary ethnography".  She was one of the first women to pursue a professional career in sociology.

Regarded today as a feminist pragmatist, MacLean is particularly remembered for her pioneering work in participant observation, and for her rigorous application of her sociological findings to immediate social problems.  She is particularly known for her studies of working and immigrant women.  MacLean's work was strongly informed by her association with social reformers such as Jane Addams, as well as founding scholars of sociology such as Albion Small, Charles Henderson, and George Herbert Mead.

Early life and education

MacLean was born in St. Peters Bay, Prince Edward Island, and raised in Nova Scotia.  Her father was a Baptist minister, and she received her preparatory education at the Baptist Acadia Seminary in Wolfville, Nova Scotia.  She went on to study at Acadia University (then known as Acadia College), receiving her bachelor's degree in 1893 and her master's in 1894.  She then emigrated to Illinois, hoping to study at the University of Chicago, which had recently been established.  Her brother Haddon had moved to Chicago in 1892, and had described the city to her.  However, due to the shortage of funds she first worked for two years at Shimer College (then known as the Mount Carroll Seminary).

MacLean was the first woman to receive a master's degree in sociology (in 1897), and the second to receive a Ph.D. (in 1900), both from the University of Chicago.  Her master's thesis was on "Factor Legislation for Women in the United States", laying the groundwork for a lifetime of work studying the conditions of working women.  Her dissertation dealt with another lifelong theme, immigration, and was titled "The Acadian Element in the Population of Nova Scotia".  A portion of the dissertation was published in 1900; the remainder appears to have been lost.

Teaching and administrative career

MacLean's teaching and administrative work began at Shimer College, then known as the Mount Carroll Seminary and located in Mount Carroll, Illinois.  She worked at Shimer from 1894 to 1896, serving as instructor of Latin and lady principal, a position approximating the later role she served as Dean of Women.  Her sister, Mildred, also worked at Shimer.  The MacLean sisters remained in contact with the Shimer community into their retirement in the 1930s.

As a woman, MacLean was largely excluded from conventional academic positions in her field.  Unlike male students, she was not hired into the sociology department, even though she "far surpassed the productivity of her male peers".  Her initial teaching posts after her graduate study were at Royal Victoria College in Montreal, where she taught from 1900 to 1901, and at Stetson University in Florida, where she taught sociology from 1901 to 1903.

She taught correspondence courses in the University of Chicago's Home Study Department from 1903 to a few months before her death in 1934.  In addition, she taught as a professor of sociology at Adelphi College from 1906 to 1916, and at the YWCA National Training School from 1903–1916.   In the Home Study Department at the U of C, MacLean worked alongside other notable women sociologists, including Edith Abbott and Sophonisba Breckinridge.  She taught courses on subjects including rural life, social technology, and immigration.  In the course of her career as a correspondence-school professor, she taught 799 students.

Sociological and writing career

MacLean was a highly sophisticated methodologist, using a pragmatic blend of methods to address the specific practical questions at hand.  Her techniques included participant observation, social surveys, and social worlds.

MacLean's research career reached its peak with a 1907-1908 study that she supervised under the auspices of the YWCA, using a staff of twenty-nine women sociologists surveying 400 companies employing a total of 135,000 women in more than twenty cities.  The study led to her pathbreaking work on women's employment, Wage-Earning Women (1910).

Later life and legacy

In the 1920s, ill health forced MacLean to retire from non-correspondence teaching. She died on May 1, 1934, at her home in Pasadena, California.  She had been living there with her sister Mildred since 1925.

MacLean's use of participant observation, well ahead of the time that this technique became mainstream, has earned her the title of "mother of ethnography",  However, the accuracy of this name has been disputed by scholars of her work, who note much earlier ethnographic work by Harriet Martineau.  MacLean's biographer Mary Jo Deegan has identified her as a predecessor to later work in case study research, contemporary critical ethnography, and feminist ethnography. MacLean's dedicated work as a correspondence educator, a relatively new phenomenon at the time, has also attracted contemporary attention.

Bibliography

Books
Wage-Earning Women (1910)
Mary Ann's Malady (1916)
Women Workers and Society (1916)
Some Problems of Reconstruction (1921)
Our Neighbors (1922)
Modern Immigration (1925)
Cheero (1928)

References

Sources

External links
Essay on MacLean by Jenn Bumb
Canada's Early Women Writers profile

1869 births
1934 deaths
People from Kings County, Prince Edward Island
People from Kings County, Nova Scotia
Acadia University alumni
University of Chicago alumni
Shimer College faculty
University of Chicago faculty
Stetson University faculty
American women sociologists
American sociologists
Ethnographers
Deans of women
American anthropologists
American women anthropologists